Irina Sanpiter (27 September 1957 – 4 February 2018) was a Soviet / Russian actress.

Biography 
Sanpiter was born on 27 September 1957 in Moscow, in USSR. She studied recitation and political sciences, a discipline in which she graduated, starting her own career as an actress in theater and, later, at the cinema, taking part in several feature films. She arrived in Italy in 1980, invited by Giorgio Arlorio and in that year she had a part without credit in a work by Ettore Scola; the following year, presenting herself to the production of the film  Bianco, rosso e Verdone . She was unexpectedly admitted to the cast, obtaining the role for which in Italy became famous, that of Magda, the wife of Furio, played by the same director Carlo Verdone. Sanpiter was dubbed with a strong Turin accent by Solvejg D'Assunta.
In the same year she played the part of Amalia in  Lacrime napulitane  Ciro Ippolito.

In 1984, due to a swelling in the neck, she discovered a lymphoma that forced her to abandon the film business due to the weakening and continuous blood transfusions to which she had to undergo.
She was active as a singer, an activity that stopped in 1990s after her marriage to the promoter Toni Evangelisti, with whom she became a concert organizer.

She was hospitalized at Policlinico Umberto I of Rome, Italy. Sanpiter died on 4 February 2018 due to a resurgence of the lymphoma for almost 34 years.

Filmography 
 Za tvoju sud'bu, by Timur Zoloev (1973)
 Každyj den' žizni, by Timur Zoloev (1974)
 Zasekrečennyj gorod, by Michail Juzovskij (1974)
 Utro, by Valeriu Jereghi (cortometraggio, 1975)
 Bezotvetnaja ljubov''', by Andrej Maljukov (1979)
 Atterraggio zero, by Aleksandr Mitta (1980)
 Febbre a 40!, by Marius Mattei (1980, come Irina Saint Peter)
 La terrazza, by Ettore Scola (1980, non-accreditata)
 Bianco, rosso e Verdone, by Carlo Verdone (1981)
 Lacrime napulitane'', by Ciro Ippolito (1981)

References 

1957 births
2018 deaths
Actresses from Moscow
Soviet actresses
Deaths from cancer in Lazio
Deaths from lymphoma
Burials at the Cimitero Flaminio